The MTV Europe Music Award for Best US Act is an award that has been given out since 2012.  The all-time winner in this category is Taylor Swift with 3 wins. Swift  is also the most nominated artist with 5 nominations.

Winners and nominees
Winners are listed first and highlighted in bold.

2010s

2020s

References

US Act
Awards established in 2013
American music awards